iPhoto is a discontinued digital photograph manipulation software application developed by Apple Inc. It was included with every Mac computer from 2002 to 2015, when it was replaced with Apple's Photos application. Originally sold as part of the iLife suite of digital media management applications, iPhoto is able to import, organize, edit, print and share digital photos.

History
iPhoto was announced at Macworld 2002, during which Steve Jobs (then-CEO of Apple) also announced that macOS would be the default operating system on new Macs, and revealed new iMac and iBook models.

On March 7, 2012, Apple CEO Tim Cook announced an iOS-native version of iPhoto alongside the third-generation iPad.

On June 27, 2014, Apple announced that they would cease development of iPhoto and work on a transition to their new Photos app. On February 5, 2015 Apple included a preview of Photos with a beta release of OS X Yosemite.

On April 8, 2015, Apple released OS X Yosemite 10.10.3, which included the new Photos app. iPhoto and Aperture were discontinued and removed from the Mac App Store, but can still be downloaded by users who previously purchased them.

macOS Mojave 10.14 was the last version of macOS to officially support iPhoto. However, a third party application allows iPhoto to run on macOS Catalina and newer.

Features

macOS version
iPhoto is designed to allow the importing of pictures from digital cameras, local storage devices such as USB flash drives, CDs, DVDs and hardrives to a user's iPhoto Library. Almost all digital cameras are recognized without additional software. iPhoto supports most common image file formats, including several Raw image formats. iPhoto also supports videos from cameras, but editing is limited to trimming clips.

After photos are imported, they can be titled, labeled, sorted and organized into groups (known as "events"). Individual photos can be edited with basic image manipulation tools, such as a red-eye filter, contrast and brightness adjustments, cropping and resizing tools, and other basic functions. iPhoto did not, however, provide the comprehensive editing functionality of programs such as Apple's own Aperture, Adobe's Photoshop, Album) or GIMP.

iPhoto offers numerous options for sharing photos. Photo albums can be made into dynamic slideshows, with the option to add music imported from iTunes. Photos can be shared via iMessage, Mail, Facebook, Flickr and Twitter. Creating and sharing iCloud Photostreams is possible as well. iPhoto is also able to sync photo albums to any iPod with a color display. These iPods might also have an audio/video output to allow photos to be played back, along with music, on any modern television. Additionally, photos can be printed to a local printer, or, in certain markets, be sent over the internet to Kodak for professional printing. iPhoto users can order a range of products, including standard prints, posters, cards, calendars, and 100-page hardcover or softcover volumes, although such services are available only to users in certain markets.

iOS version

At an Apple media event on March 7, 2012, Apple CEO Tim Cook announced a new version of iPhoto for iOS. iPhoto for iOS was made available that day on the App Store for 4.99, alongside the already-released iMovie and GarageBand for iOS. It officially supports the iPhone 4 and later, iPod Touch (4th and 5th generations), iPad 2 and later and iPad Mini (1st and 2nd generations), but users discovered that it could be installed manually on older devices using Apple's iPhone Configuration Utility.

iPhoto for iOS offers a feature set fairly comparable to that of its Mac counterpart. It can organize photos that are synced to the device or taken with its camera. Editing features include color correction tools and photo effects, as well as cropping and straightening tools. iPhoto for iOS lacks tools for creating books, calendars, cards and ordering prints. It can, however, create "Photo Journals": digital photo collages that can be uploaded to iCloud and shared.

iPhoto for iOS was highly praised for its professional tools, good performance and compatibility.

iPhoto for iOS was discontinued in 2014 and removed from the App Store in favor of the Photos app, which shipped with iOS 8.

See also
 Comparison of image viewers
 Digital photography

References

External links
 iPhoto product page at Apple.com
 
 

2002 software
Products and services discontinued in 2015
Computer-related introductions in 2002
Image organizers
IOS software
MacOS-only software made by Apple Inc.
Photo software
Products introduced in 2002